Tverrfjellet is a mountain in Skjåk Municipality in Innlandet county, Norway. The mountain is surrounded by several other notable mountains including Gjuvkampen to the north, Lomseggi to the east, Moldulhøi and Sandgrovhøi to the southeast, Hesthøi to the south, Hestdalshøgdi to the southwest, and Grjothøi.

See also
List of mountains of Norway

References

Skjåk
Mountains of Innlandet